Influenza A virus subtype H1N2 (A/H1N2) is a subtype of the species Influenza A virus (sometimes called bird flu virus). It is currently endemic in pig populations and is occasionally seen in humans.

The virus does not cause more severe illness than other influenza viruses, and no unusual increases in influenza activity have been associated with it.


History
Between December 1988 and March 1989, 19 influenza H1N2 virus isolates were identified in 6 cities in China, but the virus did not spread further.

A(H1N2) was identified during the 2001–02 flu season (northern hemisphere) in Canada, the U.S., Ireland, Latvia, France, Romania, Oman, India, Malaysia, and Singapore with earliest documented outbreak of the virus occurring in India on May 31, 2001.

On February 6, 2002, the World Health Organization (WHO) in Geneva and the Public Health Laboratory Service (PHLS) in the United Kingdom reported the identification influenza A(H1N2) virus from humans in the UK, Israel, and Egypt.

The 2001–02 Influenza A(H1N2) Wisconsin strain appears to have resulted from the reassortment of the genes of the currently circulating influenza A(H1N1) and A(H3N2) subtypes.

In March 2018 a single case of H1N2 was identified in a 19-month-old in the Netherlands.

In January 2019 a single case of H1N2 was identified in Sweden.

Because the hemagglutinin protein of the virus is similar to that of the currently circulating A(H1N1) viruses and the neuraminidase protein is similar to that of the current A(H3N2) viruses, the seasonal flu vaccine should provide good protection against influenza virus as well as protection against the currently circulating seasonal A(H1N1), A(H3N2), and B viruses.

In October 2020, a case of the H1N2 variant H1N2v was confirmed in Alberta, Canada and was the first confirmed human case in the country.

In September 2021, a case was found in France.

References

External links
 Influenza Research Database Database of influenza genomic sequences and related information.

H1N2